Caitriona Reed (born 1949) is a trans woman sensei of Thiền Zen Buddhism who also has a background in Vipassanā meditation. She co-founded Ordinary Dharma in Los Angeles, California; the rural Manzanita Village Retreat Center, located in San Diego County; and Five Changes, to mentor aspiring leaders, cultural creatives, and spiritual visionaries. Reed, a member of the American Zen Teachers Association, led retreats and workshops in Vipassana, Deep Ecology, and Buddhism 1981–2008. She received authority to teach Zen from Thich Nhat Hanh in 1992.

She is a 'woman of transsexual experience' who transitioned in 1996. She stated about her transitioning, "As a teacher encouraging others to live more honest and authentic lives, it was increasingly difficult for me to deny a basic fact—that I was a woman."

Currently, informed by her work as a Buddhist teacher, Reed focuses on public speaking; mentoring individual clients; and together with her partner Michele Benzamin-Miki conducting professional certification training in neuro-linguistic programming and hypnotherapy with an emphasis holistic approaches to life-coaching and personal and professional mentorship.

Personal life
Prior to her transition Reed married her long-time partner (since 1981) artist, Aikido and Iaido Sensei Michele Benzamin-Miki. They continue living and working together.

Published Essays
 Dharma Gaia: A Harvest of Essays in Buddhism and Ecology (Alan Hunt Badiner, Editor)
 What Makes A Man: 22 Writers Imagine The Future (2004) (Rebecca Walker, Editor)
 The Hidden Lamp: Stories from Twenty-Five Centuries of Awakened Women (2012) (Florence Caplow and Susan Moon, Editors)

See also
Buddhism in the United States
Buddhism and sexual orientation
Timeline of Zen Buddhism in the United States
Neuro-linguistic programming

References

External links 
 Official site
 Coming Out Whole

1949 births
Living people
American motivational speakers
Women motivational speakers
American hypnotists
Life coaches
Neuro-linguistic programming
American Zen Buddhist spiritual teachers
Female Buddhist spiritual teachers
LGBT Buddhists
LGBT people from California
Thiền Buddhists
Transgender women
21st-century LGBT people
American Buddhists